Justice Browning may refer to:

Chauncey Browning Sr. (1903–1971), associate justice of the Supreme Court of Appeals of West Virginia
George L. Browning (1867–1947), associate justice of the Virginia Supreme Court

See also
Judge Browning (disambiguation)